WMKZ (93.1 FM) is a radio station  broadcasting a country music format. Licensed to Monticello, Kentucky, United States.  The station is currently owned by Monticello-Wayne County Media, Inc. and features programming  Westwood One.

History
The station went on the air as WPFC on 1990-02-21.  On 1990-03-02, the station changed its call sign to the current WMKZ.

References

External links

MKZ
Monticello, Kentucky
Country radio stations in Kentucky
1990 establishments in Kentucky
Radio stations established in 1990